Jordan participated in the 2010 Asian Beach Games in Muscat, Oman from 8 to 16 December 2010.

Nations at the 2010 Asian Beach Games
2010
Asian Beach Games